Akinobu (written , , , , , , or ) is a masculine Japanese given name. Notable people with the name include:

, Japanese Paralympic swimmer
, Japanese boxer
, Japanese court noble
, Japanese baseball player and manager
, Japanese baseball player and manager
, Japanese judoka
, Japanese manga artist
, Japanese footballer

Japanese masculine given names